The 1988–89 County Championship was the 47th season of the Liga IV, the fourth tier of the Romanian football league system. The champions of each county association play against one from a neighboring county in a playoff to gain promotion.

Promotion play-off 
Teams promoted to Divizia C without a play-off matches as teams from less represented counties in the third division.

 (IL) Rapid Fetești
 (TR) Dunărea Zimnicea
 (VL) Metalul Râmnicu Vâlcea
 
 (MH) CSM Drobeta-Turnu Severin
 (GR) Rapid Braniștea
 (AB) Soda Ocna Mureș

Preliminary round

|-
||0–0||0–3
|}

The matches was played on 2 and 6 August 1989.

|-
||0–5||0–4
||4–1||1–1
||3–1||0–2
||4–0||2–1
||3–0||1–3
||2–0||1–6
||1–0||0–0
||3–1||0–3
||4–1||0–3
||2–1||0–3
||2–2||1–2
||2–1||1–4
||1–2||0–0
||2–3||2–5
||2–2||0–2
||5–1||1–2
||0–0||0–4
|}

County leagues

Arad County

Harghita County

Hunedoara County

Maramureș County

See also 
 1988–89 Divizia A
 1988–89 Divizia B

References

External links
 FRF

Liga IV seasons
4
Romania